Leo Gratten Carroll (25 October 1886 – 16 October 1972) was an English actor. In a career of more than forty years, he appeared in six Hitchcock films including Spellbound, Strangers on a Train and North by Northwest and in three television series, Topper, Going My Way, and The Man from U.N.C.L.E..

Early life
Carroll was born in Weedon Bec, Northamptonshire, to William and Catherine Carroll. His Roman Catholic parents named him after then-Pope Leo XIII. In 1897, his family lived in York, where his Irish-born father was a foreman in an ordnance store. In the 1901 census for West Ham, Essex, his occupation is listed as "wine trade clerk". In the 1911 census, he is living at the same address and described as a "dramatic agent".

Stage career
Carroll made his stage debut in 1912. His acting career was on hold during the First World War, when he served in the British Army. Carroll saw action in France, Salonika, and Palestine during the war; he was badly wounded while serving in the latter. After his recovery and discharge, he again took up acting in December 1919.

He then performed in London and on Broadway. His American stage debut came in The Vortex. In 1933, he was a member of the Manhattan Theatre Repertory Company in the inaugural season of the Ogunquit Playhouse in Ogunquit, Maine.

During 1933–34 Carroll had the role of "impeccable valet" Trump in the Broadway play The Green Bay Tree (which has no relation to the novel by Louis Bromfield apart from the shared title), and in 1941 starred with Vincent Price and Judith Evelyn in Patrick Hamilton's Angel Street (better known as Gaslight), which ran for three years at the Golden Theatre on West 45th Street in New York City.

After the production closed, he starred in the title role in John P. Marquand's The Late George Apley. In 1947 he starred in John Van Druten's The Druid Circle at the Morosco Theatre.

Films and television

Carroll, who had moved to Hollywood, made his film debut in Sadie McKee (1934). He often played doctors or butlers, but he made appearances as Marley's ghost in A Christmas Carol (1938) and as Joseph in Wuthering Heights (1939). In the original version of Father of the Bride (1950), he played an unctuous wedding caterer. In the 1951 film The Desert Fox: The Story of Rommel he played a sympathetic German field marshal, Gerd von Rundstedt, presenting him as a tragic, resigned figure completely disillusioned with Hitler.

Carroll is perhaps best known for his roles in six Alfred Hitchcock films: Rebecca (1940), Suspicion (1941), Spellbound (1945), The Paradine Case (1947), Strangers on a Train (1951) and North by Northwest (1959). He appeared in more Hitchcock films than anyone other than Clare Greet (1871–1939) (who appeared in seven) and Hitchcock himself, whose cameos were a trademark. As with earlier roles, he was often cast as doctors or other authority figures (such as the spymaster "Professor" in North by Northwest). He also appeared in a couple of Charlie Chan films, one being "City of Darkness" (1939) as a shady French locksmith, followed by a role in 
Charlie Chan's "Murder Cruise" (1940) as a passenger on ship.

Carroll also had a central role in the highly rated movie We're No Angels with Humphrey Bogart, Peter Ustinov and Basil Rathbone, among others.

In addition to appearing as Rev. Mosby with actress Hayley Mills in The Parent Trap (1961), Carroll is remembered for his role as the frustrated banker haunted by the ghosts of George and Marion Kerby in the television series Topper (1953–1956), with co-stars Anne Jeffreys, Robert Sterling and Lee Patrick. He appeared as the older Father Fitzgibbon from 1962 to 1963 in ABC's Going My Way, a series about two Roman Catholic priests at St. Dominic's parish in New York City. In 1963–1964, he portrayed John Miller in Channing on ABC. Carroll subsequently starred as spymaster Alexander Waverly on The Man from U.N.C.L.E. (1964–1968). Several U.N.C.L.E. films were derived from the series, and a spin-off television series, The Girl from U.N.C.L.E. in 1966. He was one of the first actors to appear in two different television series as the same character. Leo G. Carroll is mentioned in The Rocky Horror Show opening song "Science Fiction/Double Feature".

He appeared in spots on the first two regular episodes of Rowan & Martin's Laugh-In, the series that replaced U.N.C.L.E., and in fact appears as Mr. Waverly in the very first episode party scene where he is seen using a pen communicator to call Kuryakin to report that he believes he has found THRUSH headquarters.

Death
In 1972, Carroll died in Hollywood of cancer-induced pneumonia. He is interred at the Grand View Memorial Park Cemetery in Glendale, California.

In popular culture
Carroll was posthumously referenced in the lyrics of "Science Fiction/Double Feature", the opening song of the musical stage production The Rocky Horror Show and its 1975 film adaptation. The song refers to Carroll in connection with his role in the film Tarantula.

Selected filmography
{| class="wikitable sortable"
|-
! Year
! Film
! Role
! Director
! class="unsortable" | Notes
|-
| 1934
| Sadie McKee
| Phelps Finnegan
| Clarence Brown
| 
|-
| 1934
| Stamboul Quest
| Kruger, #117 aka Bertram Church
| Sam WoodJack Conway (uncredited)
| uncredited
|-
| 1934
| The Barretts of Wimpole Street| Dr. Ford-Waterlow
| Sidney Franklin| 
|-
| 1934
| Outcast Lady| Dr. Masters
| Robert Z. Leonard| 
|-
| 1935
| Clive of India| Mr. Manning
| Richard Boleslawski| 
|-
| 1935
| The Right to Live| Dr. Harvester
| William Keighley| 
|-
| 1935
| Murder on a Honeymoon| Joseph B. Tate
| Lloyd Corrigan| 
|-
| 1935
| The Casino Murder Case| Smith
| Edwin L. Marin| 
|-
| 1936
| The Man I Marry| Mr. Furthermore,
| Ralph Murphy| uncredited
|-
| 1937
| Captains Courageous| Burns
| Victor Fleming| uncredited
|-
| 1937
| London by Night| Correy
| Wilhelm Thiele| 
|-
| 1938
| A Christmas Carol| Marley's Ghost
| Edwin L. Marin| 
|-
| 1939
| Bulldog Drummond's Secret Police| Henry Seaton
| James P. Hogan| 
|-
| 1939
| Wuthering Heights| Joseph
| William Wyler| 
|-
| 1939
| The Private Lives of Elizabeth and Essex| Sir Edward Coke
| Michael Curtiz| 
|-
| 1939
| Tower of London| Lord Hastings
| Rowland V. Lee| 
|-
| 1939
| Charlie Chan in City in Darkness| Louis Santelle
| Herbert I. Leeds| 
|-
| 1940
| Charlie Chan's Murder Cruise| Professor Gordon
| Eugene Forde| 
|-
| 1940
| Waterloo Bridge| Policeman
| Mervyn LeRoy| uncredited
|-
| 1940
| Rebecca| Dr. Baker
| Alfred Hitchcock| 
|-
| 1941
| Scotland Yard| Craven
| Norman Foster| 
|-
| 1941
| This Woman Is Mine| Angus 'Sandy' McKay
| Frank Lloyd| 
|-
| 1941
| Bahama Passage| Delbridge
| Edward H. Griffith| 
|-
| 1941
| Suspicion| Captain Melbeck
| Alfred Hitchcock| 
|-
| 1945
| The House on 92nd Street| Col. Hammersohn
| Henry Hathaway| 
|-
| 1945
| Spellbound| Dr. Murchison
| Alfred Hitchcock| 
|-
| 1947
| Time Out of Mind| Capt. Fortune
| Robert Siodmak| 
|-
| 1947
| Song of Love| Professor Wieck
| Clarence Brown| 
|-
| 1947
| The Paradine Case| Sir Joseph
| Alfred Hitchcock| 
|-
| 1947
| Forever Amber| Matt Goodgroome
| Otto Preminger| 
|-
| 1948
| So Evil My Love| Jarvis
| Lewis Allen| 
|-
| 1948
| Enchantment| Proutie
| Irving Reis| 
|-
| 1950
| Father of the Bride| Mr. Massoula
| Vincente Minnelli| 
|-
| 1950
| The Happy Years| The Old Roman
| William Wellman| 
|-
| 1951
| The First Legion| Father Rector Paul Duquesne
| Douglas Sirk| 
|-
| 1951
| The Desert Fox| Field Marshal Gerd von Rundstedt
| Henry Hathaway| 
|-
| 1951
| Strangers on a Train| Sen. Morton
| Alfred Hitchcock| 
|-
| 1952
| The Snows of Kilimanjaro| Uncle Bill
| Henry King| 
|-
| 1952
| The Bad and the Beautiful| Henry Whitfield
| Vincente Minnelli| 
|-
| 1953
| Treasure of the Golden Condor| Raoul Dondel
| Delmer Daves| 
|-
| 1953
| Rogue's March| Col. Henry Lenbridge
| Geoffrey Barkas| 
|-
| 1953
| Young Bess| Mr. Mums
| George Sidney| 
|-
| 1955
| We're No Angels| Felix Ducotel
| Michael Curtiz| 
|-
| 1955
| Tarantula| Prof. Gerald Deemer
| Jack Arnold| 
|-
| 1956
| The Swan| Caesar
| Charles Vidor| 
|-
| 1959
| North by Northwest| the Professor
| Alfred Hitchcock| 
|-
| 1961
| The Parent Trap| Rev. Dr. Mosby
| David Swift| 
|-
| 1961
| One Plus One| Professor Logan
| 
| 
|-
| 1963
| The Prize| Count Bertil Jacobsson
| Mark Robson| 
|-
| 1965
| That Funny Feeling| O'Shea
| Richard Thorpe| 
|-
| 1968
| From Nashville with Music| Arnold
| 
| 
|-
|}

As Alexander Waverly (The Man from U.N.C.L.E.)

 To Trap A Spy (1964)
 The Spy with My Face (1965)
 One Spy Too Many (1966)
 One of Our Spies Is Missing (1966)
 The Spy in the Green Hat (1967)
 The Karate Killers (1967)
 The Helicopter Spies (1968)
 How to Steal the World'' (1968)

References

External links

 
 

1886 births
1972 deaths
20th-century English male actors
Actors from Northamptonshire
British Army personnel of World War I
British expatriate male actors in the United States
Burials at Grand View Memorial Park Cemetery
Deaths from cancer in California
Deaths from pneumonia in California
English expatriates in the United States
English male film actors
English male stage actors
English male television actors
English people of Irish descent
Male actors from Los Angeles
People from Weedon Bec